The 2017 Mountain West Conference football season, part of that year's NCAA Division I FBS football season, was the 19th season of college football for the Mountain West Conference (MW). Since 2012, 12 teams have competed in MW football—the conference's 11 full members, plus football-only member Hawaii. The regular season began on August 26 and ended on November 25. The Mountain West Championship Game was played on December 2, where Mountain Division champion Boise State defeated West Division champion Fresno State to win their first Mountain West championship since 2014.

Pre-season

Mountain West Media
2017 Mountain West media days took place on July 25 & 26 at the Cosmopolitan.

Preseason Polls

First place votes in parenthesis

Preseason All–Mountain West Team

Preseason Offensive Player of the Year:
Josh Allen, JR., QB, Wyoming
Preseason Defensive Player of the Year:
Andrew Wingard, JR., DB, Wyoming
Preseason Special Teams Player of the Year:
Rashaad Penny, SR., KR, San Diego State

(* – member of the 2016 All–Mountain West first team)

(** – member of the 2016 All–Mountain West second team)

Coaches
NOTE: Stats shown are before the beginning of the season

Rankings

Listed are the Mountain West teams who were ranked or received votes at some point during the season. Air Force, Hawaii, Nevada, New Mexico, San Jose State, Utah State and UNLV were never ranked or received any votes.

Schedule

Regular season

Week One

Week Two

{{CFB Conference Schedule Entry
| w/l           = w
| date          = September 9
| time          = 9:00 p.m.
| visiting_rank = 
| visiting_team = San Diego State
| home_rank     = 
| home_team     = Arizona State
| site_stadium  = Sun Devil Stadium
| site_cityst   = Tucson, AZ
| gamename      =
| tv            = P12N
| score         = 30–20
| overtime      = 
| attend        = 54,336
}}

Week Three

Week Four

Week Five

Week Six

Week Seven

Week Eight

Week Nine

Week Ten

Week Eleven

Week Twelve

Week Thirteen

Championship Game

Week Fourteen (Mountain West Championship game)

The 2017 Mountain West Championship Game was held on December 2 between the champions of the Mountain Division, Boise State and the West Division, Fresno State. Boise State beat Fresno State 17–10.

Records against FBS conferences

Power Five conferences and independents 

Group of Five conferences 

FCS Subdivision

Postseason

Postseason

Bowl games

Boise State's ranking is from the CFP Poll.Selection of teams: Boise State, Colorado State, Fresno State, San Diego State, Utah State, & Wyoming (6)Awards and honors

All Conference TeamsOffensive Player of the Year: Rashaad Penny, Sr., RB, San Diego StateDefensive Player of the Year: Leighton Vander Esch, Jr., LB, Boise StateSpecial Teams Player of the Year: Rashaad Penny, Sr., KR/PR, San Diego StateFreshman of the Year: Armani Rogers, QB, UNLVCoach of the Year: Jeff Tedford, Fresno StateOffense:

(* – Two-Time First-Team Selection)(** – Three-Time First-Team Selection)Defense:

(* – Two-Time Second-Team Selection)Honorable Mentions:Air Force: Grant Ross, Sr., LB.Boise State: Ezra Cleveland, Fr., OL; Haden Hoggarth, Jr., PK; Alexander Mattison, So., RB; Tyson Maeva, So., LB; Durrant Miles, Jr., DL; John Molchon, So., OL; DeAndre Pierce, So., DB.Colorado State: Evan Colorito, Sr., LB; Dalton Fackrell, Sr., TE; Trae Moxley, Sr., OL; Ryan Stonehouse, Fr., P; Josh Watson, Jr., LB.Fresno State: Mike Bell, So., DB; Jaron Bryant, So., DB; Christian Cronk, Jr., OL; Malik Forrester, Sr., DL; George Helmuth, Jr., LB; Juju Hughes, So., DB; Marcus McMaryion, Jr., QB; Netane Muti, Fr., OL; David Patterson, Sr., OL; Micah St. Andrew, Jr., OL; Robert Stanley, Sr., DL.Hawai'i: Meffy Koloamatangi, Sr., DL; Viane Moala, So., DL.Nevada: Ty Gangi, Jr., QB; Sean Krepsz, Jr., OL; Austin Paulhus, Sr., LB; Asauni Rufus, Jr., DB.New Mexico: Blaise Fountain, Sr., OL; Garrett Hughes, Sr., DL; Aaron Jenkins, Jr., OL; Jake Rothschiller, Sr., DB.San Diego State: Parker Baldwin, Jr., DB; Mikah Holder, Sr., WR.San Jose State: Bryce Crawford, Jr., PK; Chris Gonzalez, Sr., OL.UNLV: Nathan Jacobson, Jr., OL; Kyle Saxelid, Sr., OL.Utah State: Roman Andrus, Jr., OL; Quin Ficklin, Jr., OL; Dallin Leavitt, Sr., DB; Dax Raymond, So., TE.Wyoming: Josh Allen, Sr., QB; Tyler Hall, So., RET.

Home game attendanceBold''' – Exceed capacity
†Season High

References